The Asian Australasian Society of Neurological Surgeons (AASNS) is the inter-continental, non-governmental, learned society representing neurosurgeons of the Asian-Australasian region. It was founded in 1964 and is made up of twenty-eight national societies, totaling 60 percent of neurosurgeons globally. It is the largest of the five continental associations (AANS, AASNS, CAANS, EANS and FLANC) of the World Federation of Neurosurgical Societies. The official journal of the society is the Journal of Clinical Neuroscience.

Affiliated national societies 
The following societies representing their respective country are constituents of AASNS:
Neurosurgical Society of Australasia
Bangladesh Society of Neurosurgeons
Chinese Neurosurgical Society
Chinese Congress of Neurological Surgeons
Emirates Neuroscience Society
Academy of Filipino Neurosurgeons
Hong Kong Neurosurgical Society
Neurosurgical Section of Neurological Society of India
Indonesian Neurosurgical Society
Israel Neurosurgical Society
Japan Neurosurgical Society
Japanese Congress of Neurological Surgeons
Korean Neurosurgical Society
Neurosurgical Association of Malaysia
Nepalese Society of Neurosurgeon
New Zealand Neurosurgical Society
Saudi Association of Neurological Surgery
Clinical Neuroscience Society of Singapore
Taiwan Neurosurgical Society
The Royal College of Neurological Surgeons of Thailand
Uzbekistan Society of Neurosurgery
Pan Arab Neurosurgical Society

Past Presidents 
List of the past presidents in chronological order:
 Douglas Miller
 Keiji Sano
 Udon Poshakrina
 Romeo Gustillo
 HL Wen
 J Geoffrey Toakley
 Kil Soo Choi
 Ching-Chang Hung
 Iftikhar Ali Raja
 Balaji Sadasivan
 Tetsuo Kanno
 Yong-Kwang TU
 Andrew Kaye
 Basant Misra

References 

Learned societies
Medical and health organisations based in Singapore
Neurosurgery organizations
International organisations based in Singapore